Halls Creek is a stream in the U.S. state of Ohio. It is a tributary to the Little Miami River.

Halls Creek was named after an early settler.

References

Rivers of Warren County, Ohio
Rivers of Ohio